Letterkenny Golf Club (often referred to as the Barnhill) is a golf club located on the banks of Lough Swilly in Letterkenny, County Donegal, Ireland. The club was founded in 1913.

History

Golf began in the town many years before 1913 on rough ground near the Ramelton Road. Golfing facilities later moved to a  9-hole course at Crievesmith, in Oldtown, in 1913 where the club was formed. Crievesmith was sold in 1965 for £3000 and the club moved to Barnhill and remain there to this day. The ground at Crievesmith is currently used for housing.

When the club moved to Barnhill an old farmhouse located on the land was used as the clubhouse. This farmhouse was extended in 1967 before new  clubhouse was opened in 1999 with a restaurant and conference facilities. In July 2007, the Declan Brannigan redesigned course was officially opened, addressing drainage problems which the old course had suffered from. The course has 18 holes and has views of Lough Swilly.

In 1999, the club hosted the Ladies Irish Open.

References

External links
 Official website
 Letterkenny Golf Club at irelandnorthwest.ie
 Letterkenny Golf club at irishgolfcourses.co.uk
 Letterkenny Golf Club at ireland.ie
 Letterkenny Golf Club at greenfeesavers.co.uk
 Letterkenny Golf Club at donegaldirect.ie

Golf clubs and courses in the Republic of Ireland
Golf in Ulster
Organisations based in Letterkenny
Sport in Letterkenny
Sports clubs in County Donegal
Sports venues completed in 1913
1913 establishments in Ireland